The 5th Legislative Assembly of Saskatchewan was elected in the Saskatchewan general election held in June 1921. The assembly sat from December 8, 1921, to May 9, 1925. The Liberal Party led by William Melville Martin formed the government. After Martin retired in 1922, Charles Avery Dunning became Liberal party leader and Premier. The former leader of the Conservative Party, Donald Maclean had left politics to serve as a judge shortly before the election. The opposition in the assembly was unorganized and there was no official opposition leader in 1921 or 1922. Independent member John Archibald Maharg served as leader of the opposition in 1923 and Harris Turner, also independent, served as opposition leader in 1924 and 1925.

George Adam Scott served as speaker for the assembly.

Members of the Assembly 
The following members were elected to the assembly in 1921:

Notes:

Party standings 

Notes:

By-elections 
By-elections were held to replace members for various reasons:

Notes:

References 

Terms of the Saskatchewan Legislature